Myway Airlines is a Georgian carrier based at Tbilisi International Airport in Tbilisi, Georgia.

History
In June 2016, Myway Airlines was registered in Tbilisi, Georgia.

In October and November 2017, two Boeing 737-800 aircraft were delivered to Myway Airlines.

On 23 January 2018, the airline received its air operator's certificate (AOC) with plans to begin operations in May 2018.  Flights between Tbilisi and Tel Aviv began on 28 June 2018.

Destinations
Currently, the airline is operating regular scheduled services along with charter flights to various destinations. As of May 2021, Myway Airlines operates to the following destinations:

Fleet

As of May 2021, Myway Airlines operates the following aircraft:

References

External links

 

Airlines of Georgia (country)
Airlines established in 2016
2016 establishments in Georgia (country)